Mount Atimbia is a mountain in Laguna and has an elevation of 654 metres. Mount Atimbia is situated northeast of Mount Mabilog and east of Kalisungan. It is found on the Laguna Volcanic Field.

References 

San Pablo, Laguna
Landforms of Laguna (province)